Corbridge is a village in Northumberland, England,  west of Newcastle and  east of Hexham. Villages nearby include Halton, Acomb, Aydon and Sandhoe.

Etymology
Corbridge was known to the Romans as something like Corstopitum or Coriosopitum, and wooden writing tablets found at the Roman fort of Vindolanda nearby suggest it was probably locally called Coria (meaning a tribal centre). According to Bethany Fox, the early attestations of the English name Corbridge "show variation between Cor- and Col-, as in the earliest two forms, Corebricg and Colebruge, and there has been extensive debate about what its etymology may be. Some relationship with the Roman name Corstopitum seems clear, however".

History

Roman fort and town

Coria was the most northerly town in the Roman Empire, lying at the junction of the Stanegate and Dere Street, the two most important local Roman roads.

The first fort was established c. AD 85, although there was a slightly earlier base nearby at Beaufront Red House. By the middle of the 2nd century AD, the fort was replaced by a town with two walled military compounds, which were garrisoned until the end of the Roman occupation of the site. The best-known finds from the site include the stone Corbridge Lion and the Corbridge Hoard of Roman armour and sundry other items. In Rudyard Kipling's Puck of Pook's Hill, the town of Hunno on the Wall is probably based on Corstopitum.

The Roman Town is now managed by English Heritage on behalf of HM Government. The site has been largely excavated and features a large museum and shop. The fort is the top-rated attraction in Corbridge and is open daily between 10 and 6 in the summer and at weekends between 10 and 4 in the winter.

Buildings

The Church of England parish church of Saint Andrew is thought to have been consecrated in 676. Saint Wilfrid is supposed to have had the church built at the same time as Hexham Abbey. It has been altered several times since, with a Norman doorway, and a lychgate built as a First World War memorial. The Church is built largely from stone taken from Hadrian's Wall to the north, and the entrance to the Church is through glass doors given by Rowan Atkinson (known for Blackadder and Mr. Bean) and etched in memory of his mother, a parishioner.

There are only three fortified vicarages in the county, and one of these is in Corbridge. Built in the 14th century, the Vicar's Pele is to be found in the south-east corner of the churchyard, and has walls 1.3 metres (4 ft) in thickness. The register for St Andrew's dates from 1657. Later on in the town's history, Wesleyan, Primitive and Free Methodist chapels were all built too.

Even older than the Vicar's Pele is Corbridge Low Hall, dating from the late 13th or early 14th century, with one end converted to a pele tower in the 15th century. The main block was remodelled in the 16th and 17th centuries, and the building restored c. 1890. Corbridge Town Hall was designed by Frank Emley and completed in 1887.

A number of fine Victorian mansions were developed on Prospect Hill to house successful industrialists and local businessmen in the late 19th century, after the arrival of the railway facilitated commuting to Newcastle.

Border warfare
Corbridge suffered, as did many other settlements in the county, from the border warfare which was particularly prevalent between 1300 and 1700. Raids were commonplace, and it was not unusual for the livestock to be brought into the town at night and a watch placed to guard either end of the street for marauders. A bridge over the Tyne was built in the 13th century, but this original has not survived. The present bridge, an impressive stone structure with seven arches, was erected in 1674.

Governance 
Corbridge is in the parliamentary constituency of Hexham, Guy Opperman of the Conservative Party is the Member of Parliament.

Prior to Brexit, for the European Parliament its residents voted to elect MEP's for the North East England constituency.

For Local Government purposes it belongs to Northumberland County Council a unitary authority. An electoral ward of the same name exists. This ward includes Corbridge and Sandhoe. It had a total population taken at the 2011 census of 4,191. 
The Parish itself is run by Corbridge Parish Council which elects 10 Councillors on 4 year terms; one of them is selected by members of the council to be Chairman and Vice Chairman respectively on 1 year terms. They meet on the fourth Wednesday of every month. The Meetings take place at Corbridge Parish Hall.

Transport

Corbridge is bypassed to the north by the A69 road, linking it to Newcastle and Carlisle.

Buses
The 685 and 602 bus routes link the town to Tyneside and Carlisle. Service 685 also provides a link to the town of Hexham. 

Railway
The town is served by Corbridge railway station on the Newcastle & Carlisle Railway, also known as the Tyne Valley line. The line follows the course of the River Tyne through Northumberland.

Passenger services on the Tyne Valley Line are operated by Northern and ScotRail. The line is also heavily used for freight.

Fairs and shows
Stagshaw Bank Fair, traditionally held on 4 July, was one of the most famous of the country fairs. It included a huge sale of stock, and was proclaimed each year by the bailiff to the Duke of Northumberland. The Northumberland County Show, an agricultural event, was held in the fields outside Corbridge each year before moving to Bywell in 2013.

The Corbridge Steam Fair and Vintage Rally is held every year in June to celebrate steam engines. There are also classic cars, trucks and tractors.

Corbridge Festival has taken place since 2011 and is usually held on the last weekend of June or the first in July. Headliners have included The Coral and Fun Lovin' Criminals. The festival now includes three stages and up to 50 bands.

A Midsummer’s Evening in Corbridge marks the summer solstice each year with performers, stalls and late night shopping in the village from 4pm to 9pm.

Each year on the first Monday in December, the village hosts Christmas in Corbridge with carol singing, food stalls and late night shopping.

Notable people
Born at Corbridge
 Alan Brown (footballer) (1914–96), professional footballer and manager
 Mary Flora Bell (born 1957), woman who at age 11 was convicted of the manslaughter of two younger boys
 Steve Bruce (born 1960), professional footballer and manager
 John Blackburn (1923–93), thriller writer
Lived at Corbridge
 Catherine Cookson (1906–98), author
 Carol Malia, BBC Look North presenter
 Alan Pardew (born 1961), professional footballer and manager
 Rachel Unthank, Folk Musician
 Ruth Ainsworth (1908–84), children's writer of the Rufty Tufty Golliwog series

References

External links

Vicar's Pele Tower
Corbridge's river crossings
Corstopitum
Corbridge Parish Council
Northumberland Communities (Accessed: 10 November 2008)
Roman empire.net article on Roman Corbridge
Ecology in Corbridge

 
Villages in Northumberland
80s establishments
1st-century establishments in Roman Britain
Populated places established in the 1st century
Civil parishes in Northumberland